Marcello Minenna is an Italian economist, civil servant and editorialist. He has been head of quants at Consob, academic fellow at Bocconi University, and lecturer at the London Graduate School of Mathematical Finance. Currently he teaches at the Sapienza University of Rome and at the Università Telematica San Raffaele di Roma as an adjunct professor. In 2020 he was appointed director of the Italian Customs and Monopolies Agency. He ceased to hold this office in January 2023. On the 1st of February 2023 he was appointed technical assessor for Calabria. His mandate covers the following areas: environment and territory, financial programming, public subsidiary companies and strategic projects.

Early life and education 
In 1994 he obtained a Master's degree in economics at the Bocconi University. He received a Phd in "Mathematics for the analysis of the financial markets" from Università degli studi di Brescia, and he obtained a Master of Arts at Columbia University

Career 
He worked briefly in the Procter & Gamble's market research department. In 1996 he joined the inspectorate office at Consob, and was appointed director of this office in 2015.

Minenna is a qualified chartered accountant and auditor, professor in financial intermediaries economics and corporate finance and a senior lecturer in political economy and in mathematics for economics and actuarial and financial sciences.

He conducted a series of technical lectures on financial derivatives and on structured financial products. He was a technical advisor for the Presidency of the Republic. For his expertise in economics and finances he was appointed rapporteur by the Camera dei Deputati and by the Senato della Repubblica in regard to legislative measures and consultations. 

Following the law on savings enactment, Minenna developed his own supervisory approach, which was adopted and transposed into national law in 2009. This specific supervisory approach provides a "quantitative framework that enables the assessment of the short term investment frame, the degree of risk, and relative potential profitability for each non equity financial instrument". This approach was then formalized in an essay titled "A Quantitative Framework to Assess the Risk-Return Profile of Non-Equity Products"; the preface to this book was written by Hélyette Geman.
For Consob, Minenna developed a website automatic scanning procedure that is able to identify online illegal activities by systematically browsing the web using "spider" internet bots. This procedure led to the shutdown of hundreds of illegal websites.

He produced pioneering results in the field of quantitative methods applied to the surveillance of financial markets focused on insider trading analysis,
market abuse detection
and risk disclosure of structured products through synthetic indicators.
In several public consultations these indicators have received the support of distinguished members of the international academia.

For his work he has been cited as Quant Enforcer
and Quant Regulator
by Risk magazine.

Minenna is one of the European economists that propose a radical change of European Central Bank (ECB) policy, from an inflation target to an interest rate target, in order to achieve a substantial levelling of the real interest rates among the Eurozone countries (the zero spread strategy). This would imply also the use of unconventional monetary measures, up to a partial debt monetization by the ECB. This idea had some resonance in the national press and abroad.

In numerous occasions Minenna represented Consob in events of interinstitutional cooperation, such as the "The state-generals' repression of organized crime" for the Justice Ministry, and the MEF-Consob-Banca d'Italia task force in the field of trasparency regulations on derivatives transactions made by local authorities.

He has been selected as finance chief in the council of Virginia Raggi in Rome. He resigned on the 31st of August 2016, together with other four senior city officials.

On 31 January 2020, Marcello Minenna was appointed director of the Italian Customs and Monopolies Agency. On 13 January 2023 he was the only director of a fiscal agency not confirmed by the Government which replaced him with Roberto Alesse.

Minenna is a columnist for both Italian (Il Sole 24 Ore, Corriere della sera, La Repubblica) and international (The Wall Street Journal, Financial Times) newspapers.

Selected publications
 The Incomplete Currency. Wiley, 2016. .
 La moneta incompiuta. Ediesse, 2013. .
 A Quantitative Framework to Assess the Risk-Return Profile of Non-Equity Products. Risk Books, 2011. .
 A Guide to Quantitative Finance. Risk Books, 2006. .
 M. Minenna. Insider Trading, Abnormal Return, value of preferential information: Supervising through a Probabilistic Model. Journal of Banking and Finance 27, no. 1  (2003), 59-86.
 M. Minenna. Anamnesi dell'euro e possibili cure. Giurimetria-Rivista di diritto, banca e finanza, no. 1  (2015), 4-48.
 M. Minenna. Indagine conoscitiva sugli strumenti finanziari derivati. Giurimetria-Rivista di diritto, banca e finanza, no. 2  (2015), 109-126.

References

External links
 

Financial economists
Living people
Year of birth missing (living people)